Earl Ben Gilliam (August 17, 1931 – January 28, 2001) was a United States district judge of the United States District Court for the Southern District of California.

Education and career

Born in Clovis, New Mexico, Gilliam received a Bachelor of Arts degree from San Diego State University in 1953. He received a Juris Doctor from University of California, Hastings College of the Law in 1957. He was a deputy district attorney of San Diego County, California from 1957 to 1961. He was in private practice of law in San Diego from 1961 to 1963. He was a judge of the San Diego Municipal Court from 1963 to 1975. He was a judge of the San Diego County Superior Court from 1975 to 1980.

Federal judicial service

Gilliam was nominated by President Jimmy Carter on December 7, 1979, to the United States District Court for the Southern District of California, to a new seat created by 92 Stat. 1629. He was confirmed by the United States Senate on August 19, 1980, and received his commission on August 20, 1980. He assumed senior status due to a certified disability on April 2, 1993. His service was terminated on January 28, 2001, due to his death in San Diego.

Final years

Side effects of heart surgery in 1993 left Gilliam paralyzed and on dialysis for the remainder of his life and led his certification of disability. He did not perform any judicial duties after his certification of disability.

See also 
 List of African-American federal judges
 List of African-American jurists

References

Sources
 

1931 births
2001 deaths
African-American judges
Judges of the United States District Court for the Southern District of California
United States district court judges appointed by Jimmy Carter
20th-century American judges
San Diego State University alumni
University of California, Hastings College of the Law alumni
People from Clovis, New Mexico
California lawyers
20th-century American lawyers
Superior court judges in the United States
San Diego High School alumni